Sphenella melanostigma is a species of tephritid or fruit flies in the genus Sphenella of the family Tephritidae.

Distribution
South Africa.

References

Tephritinae
Insects described in 1908
Diptera of Africa
Taxa named by Mario Bezzi